Shinwell:
 Manny Shinwell (1884 - 1986), a Jewish British trade union official
 Frederick Neville Shinwell Melland (1904 - 1990), a British ice hockey player
 Shinwell Johnson, a fictional character in TV series Elementary

Jewish surnames
British Jewish families